A Timeline of Chacoan history includes Chaco Culture National Historical Park, Aztec Ruins National Monument, Twin Angels Pueblo, Casamero Pueblo, Kin Nizhoni, Pierre's Site, and Halfway House.

Paleo-Indian Period
11000 BC  First foragers?

Archaic Period
6000 BC-800 BC Hunter-gatherers

4th century CE

5th century
490 Basketmaker farming begins

6th century
500 Turquoise beads and pendants appear; offerings in great kivas (sites 29SJ423, Shabik' eshchee Village)

7th century

600-800 La Plata Black-on-White ceramic
700 Population of Chaco Canyon between 100 and 201 people

8th century

9th century

800-900 Builders use piñon, juniper, and cottonwood trees that grew close by 

850-925 Large construction projects.

875-1040 Red Mesa Black-on-White ceramics

10th century

900-1150 Large buildings, mounds, roadways, great kivas, and tri-walled structures are built throughout the San Juan Basin.

900-1125 Construction of Penasco Blanco

900 Emergence of the Chaco Anasazi

900 Chetro Ketl pueblo begun

900-1025 Chaco Wash in erosional cycle and cut a paleo-channel.

925-1130 Stable environmental conditions favorable to dry farming throughout the Colorado Plateau. Human populations also stable.

950 Keet Seel, second largest cliff dwelling. is inhabited
950 Nonlocal ponderosa is the dominant beam timber; spruce and fir increase

11th century
960-1020 Unpredictable rainfall.  Little building at Pueblo Bonito 

1000 "Chaco phenomenon" acceleration of cultural development

1000-1075Great House construction, and roads expanded. The first usage of chocolate further than central Mexico was first used in ceramic cylinders for rituals.

1000-1140Escavada Black-on-White ceramics

1025-1090 Depositional period during which time the paleo-channel was filling. There is some historical, anecdotal evidence that the inhabitants of Chaco Canyon may have constructed a dam at the west end of the canyon.

1030Chacoans seek trees at higher altitudes 

1040 Increased rainfall 

1040-1050 Building resumes at Old Bonito.  Pueblo Bonito construction stage II 

1050-1070 Pueblo Bonito becomes more complex.  Pueblo Bonito construction stage III 

1050 Imports of copper bells, Macaws, and shells (origin unknown)

1054 ~July 4 - Cliff painting near Penasco Blanco consisting of three symbols: a large star, a crescent moon, and a handprint, may portray the sighting of SN 1054, the Crab Nebula supernova.

1064, 1066 Sunset Crater volcanic eruptions; volcanic debris blankets Jemez Mountains and Bandelier area.

1080-1100 Great North Road construction.

1080 Salmon Ruin established.

1080 Construction of Pueblo Alto begins.

1090 Drought

12th century

1075-1123 Pueblo Bonito constructed at Chaco.

? Five astronomical observatories are built

1100 Peak of Chaco culture.

1100-1104 Tree felling at Pueblo del Arroyo

1106-1125 Aztec Ruins built.

1130 Pueblo Bonito is four stories tall and contains 800 rooms 

1130-1180 Fifty-year drought in the Southwest. Rain and snow cease to fall.  Alluvial groundwater declines, floodplain erosion occurs. Dry-farming zone reduced, crop production potential decreased.  Severe arroyo cutting and depression of alluvial groundwater. Severe environmental stress.

1140–1150 Collapse of the Ancestral Puebloan culture at Chaco Canyon.

1150 Great Houses empty

1180 Sunset Crater erupts for the second time.

13th century

14th century

15th century

16th century

1539 Marcos de Niza erroneously describes the pueblo of Háwikuh as the Seven Cities of Gold.

17th century

1680-1692 The Pueblo Revolt of the Pueblo people against Spanish colonists in the New Spain province.

1774 Don Bernardo de Miera y Pacheco identifies the Chaco Canyon area as "Chaca" on a map. The term, a Spanish translation of a Navajo word, is thought to be the origin for "Chacra Mesa" and "Chaco".

18th century

19th century

1844 Josiah Gregg refers to the Chaco pueblos in his book Commerce of the Prairies, making its first appearance in popular culture.

1849 Lt. James H. Simpson leads the Washington Expedition, a military reconnaissance team which surveys Navajo lands and records cultural sites in Chaco Canyon.  Illustrations created by the Kern brothers are included in a government report.

1877 Artist and photographer William Henry Jackson participates in the Hayden Survey of the Western United States, producing maps of Chaco Canyon, but no photographs due to technical problems.

1888 Richard Wetherill and Charlie Mason find the Cliff Palace, Spruce Tree House and Square Tower House.
 Chaco Canyon is surveyed and photographed by Victor and Cosmos Mindeleff of the Bureau of American Ethnology

1896 Richard Wetherill begins excavating Chaco Canyon

1896-1899 George H. Pepper from the American Museum of Natural History leads the Hyde Exploring Expedition in excavating Pueblo Bonito

20th century

1901 General Land Office special agent S. J. Holsinger recommends creating a national park to preserve archaeological sites in Chaco Canyon

1907 Chaco Canyon National Monument is established.

1928-1929 American astronomer and University of Arizona professor A. E. Douglass participates in a National Geographic Society research project exploring Chaco Canyon. Using his newly invented technique of dendrochronology, Douglass dates Chetro Ketl and dozens of Chacoan sites

 Expedition under Neil Merton Judd to collect dendrochronological specimens to date habitation of Chaco Canyon

1937 A Civilian Conservation Corps of Navajo stonemasons repairs Chacoan buildings in Chaco Canyon.  A previous group built soil conservation devices, planted trees, and improved roads and trails.

1941 Heavy rains cause Threatening Rock to fall, destroying ~60 rooms at Pueblo Bonito.

1960 Floors excavated at Una Vida

1971-1982 The Chaco Project, conducted by the National Park Service and the University of New Mexico, surveys and excavates Chaco Canyon

1976-1978 Fourteen rooms at Pueblo Alto excavated by the Chaco Project

1980 Chaco Canyon National Monument is renamed Chaco Culture National Historical Park with 13,000 acres (53 km2) added. The Chaco Culture Archaeological Protection Site program is created to protect Chacoan sites.

1982 NASA's Thermal Infrared Multispectral Scanner (TIMS) detects over 200 miles of a prehistoric (AD 900 or 1000) road system in Chaco Canyon, as well as walls, buildings, and agricultural fields.

1983 Dean and Warren estimate 200,000 trees were used to build great houses.

1987 Chaco Culture National Historical Park is designated a UNESCO World Heritage Site.

21st century

2001 Two-thirds of large roof timbers traced to Chuska Mountains and one-third to San Mateo Mountains.

References

Chacoan
Chacoan
Chaco Canyon